Robert Glenn Shaver (April 18, 1831 – January 13, 1915) was an American lawyer, militia leader, and colonel in the Confederate States Army during the American Civil War serving in several key battles in the Western Theater. After the war, he became an early leader of the Ku Klux Klan in Arkansas. Later, he served as commander of the State Guard and the Reserve Militia of Arkansas, as well the commander of the Arkansas Division of the United Confederate Veterans (U.C.V.).

References

Further reading
 Cook, V. Y. Colonel Robert G. Shaver, Confederate Veteran, vol. 23, April 1915, pp. 178–179

External links
Robert Glenn Shaver (1831–1915), Encyclopedia of Arkansas

People from Sullivan County, Tennessee
People of Arkansas in the American Civil War
American militia generals
Arkansas lawyers
Arkansas sheriffs
Confederate States Army officers
American Ku Klux Klan members
19th-century American lawyers
1831 births
1915 deaths